The Albula Pass (Romansh: Pass d'Alvra or) (el. 2312 m) is a Swiss mountain pass in the canton of Graubünden. It lies at the heart of the Albula Alps, on the watershed between the Albula, tributary of the Rhine and the Ova d'Alvra, tributary of the Inn. Overlooking the pass are the ranges of Piz Üertsch (north) and Crasta Mora (south).

The Albula Pass is an important axis from central Graubünden to Engadin. It is traversed by a paved road from Thusis to La Punt, via Bergün. It is also traversed by the Albula Railway, although at a lower elevation through the Albula Tunnel (1,820 m), from Thusis to Bever, also via Bergün.

On the summit of the pass is a hospice. East of the pass, on the Engadin side, is a lake named Albulasee (2,294 m) which is 4.2 ha large. West of the pass, at a further distance, is the larger Lai da Palpuogna, a popular stop on the Albula road.

The Albula Pass is one of the three paved road passes connecting the Engadin with the northern Grisons, the two other being the Julier Pass and the Flüela Pass.

See also
List of highest paved roads in Switzerland
List of highest road passes in Switzerland

References

External links 

 
 Profile on climbbybike.com
 
 http://www.alpentourer.com/alpine_passes/switzerland/albulapass/albulapass.html 

Mountain passes of Switzerland
Mountain passes of the Alps
Mountain passes of Graubünden
Engadin
Rail mountain passes of Switzerland
La Punt Chamues-ch
Bergün Filisur